Alden is a city in Hardin County, Iowa, United States. The population was 763 at the 2020 census.

History
Alden was laid out in 1855. It was named for its founder, Henry Alden, a native of Massachusetts. The town was incorporated February 11, 1879.

Geography
Alden's longitude and latitude coordinates in decimal form are 42.516867, -93.375809.

Demographics

2010 census
As of the census of 2010, there were 787 people, 338 households, and 214 families living in the city. The racial makeup of the city was 97.5% White, 0.5% African American, 0.1% Native American, 0.3% Asian, and 1.7% from two or more races. Hispanic or Latino of any race were 1.1% of the population.

There were 338 households, of which 28.1% had children under the age of 18 living with them, 53.6% were married couples living together, 5.6% had a female householder with no husband present, 4.1% had a male householder with no wife present, and 36.7% were non-families. 31.1% of all households were made up of individuals, and 16.5% had someone living alone who was 65 years of age or older. The average household size was 2.33 and the average family size was 2.95.

The median age in the city was 41.6 years. 23.6% of residents were under the age of 18; 8.1% were between the ages of 18 and 24; 21.3% were from 25 to 44; 29.1% were from 45 to 64; and 17.9% were 65 years of age or older. The gender makeup of the city was 50.6% male and 49.4% female.

2000 census
As of the census of 2000, there were 904 people, 351 households, and 250 families living in the city. The racial makeup of the city was 97.68% White, 0.22% Asian, 1.66% from other races, and 0.44% from two or more races. Hispanic or Latino of any race were 5.09% of the population.

There were 351 households, out of which 35.0% had children under the age of 18 living with them, 61.3% were married couples living together, 7.4% had a female householder with no husband present, and 28.5% were non-families. 25.1% of all households were made up of individuals, and 14.8% had someone living alone who was 65 years of age or older. The average household size was 2.58 and the average family size was 3.12.

In the city, the population was spread out, with 27.2% under the age of 18, 8.0% from 18 to 24, 28.0% from 25 to 44, 20.7% from 45 to 64, and 16.2% who were 65 years of age or older. The median age was 38 years. For every 100 females, there were 89.1 males. For every 100 females age 18 and over, there were 87.5 males.

The median income for a household in the city was $35,966, and the median income for a family was $39,524. Males had a median income of $29,489 versus $22,000 for females. The per capita income for the city was $16,011. About 6.7% of families and 10.6% of the population were below the poverty line, including 15.7% of those under age 18 and 8.3% of those age 65 or over.

Education
Alden Community School District operates public schools serving the community.

Library

Alden is believed to have the smallest endowed Carnegie Library built in the United States. It was built at a cost of $9,000, and was a gift from Andrew Carnegie on November 3, 1913.

The original Library was built in 1914 with the grant from the Carnegie Foundation. The Library was placed on the National Register of Historic Places in 1966. The building served Alden for 85 years. In 1998 a Capital Campaign was started to raise $550,000 for an addition that would double the size of the library.

Notable people
 Gordon Jones, actor
Bruce Rastetter, businessman and former president of the Iowa Board of Regents

References

External links
 Dr. Grace O. Doane Alden Public Library

Cities in Iowa
Cities in Hardin County, Iowa
1855 establishments in Iowa